The Ladies First Cup was a one-off invitational international women's football competition held in Calais, France in 2013. It was played from August 25 to 28, 2013, and was won by reigning European champion VfL Wolfsburg.

2013

Semi-finals

Third-place match

Final

References

Women's football friendly trophies
Recurring sporting events established in 2013